Kavresthali is a town and former Village Development Committee that is now part of  Tarakeshwar Municipality in Kathmandu District in Province No. 3 of central Nepal. At the time of the 1991 Nepal census it had a population of 3,034 and had 581 households in it.

References

Populated places in Kathmandu District